Monotone comparative statics is a sub-field of comparative statics that focuses on the conditions under which endogenous variables undergo monotone changes (that is, either increasing or decreasing) when there is a change in the exogenous parameters.  Traditionally, comparative results in economics are obtained using the Implicit Function Theorem, an approach that requires the concavity and differentiability of the objective function as well as the interiority and uniqueness of the optimal solution. The methods of monotone comparative statics typically dispense with these assumptions. It focuses on the main property underpinning monotone comparative statics, which is a form of complementarity between the endogenous variable and exogenous parameter. Roughly speaking, a maximization problem displays complementarity if a higher value of the exogenous parameter increases the marginal return of the endogenous variable. This guarantees that the set of solutions to the optimization problem is increasing with respect to the exogenous parameter.

Basic results

Motivation 

How does the correspondence  vary with ?

This guarantees that the optimum has shifted to the right, i.e., .

One-dimensional optimization problems 

The standard definition adopted by the literature is the following.

The correspondence  is said to be increasing if  whenever .

The notion of complementarity between exogenous and endogenous variables is formally captured by single crossing differences.

Definition (single crossing function): Let . Then  is a single crossing function if for any  we have .

Theorem 1: Define . The family  obey single crossing differences if and only if for all , we have  for any .

We only need to consider the case where . Since , we obtain , which guarantees that . Furthermore,  so that . To show the necessity of single crossing differences, set , where . Then  for any  guarantees that, if , then . Q.E.D.

Note that  obey single crossing differences. Indeed, take any  and assume that ; for any  such that  , we obtain . By Theorem 1, the profit-maximizing output decreases as the marginal cost of output increases, i.e., as  decreases.

Interval dominance order 

Single crossing differences is not a necessary condition for the optimal solution to be increasing with respect to a parameter.

Definition (Interval): Let .

For example, if , then  is an interval of  but not . Denote .

Like single crossing differences, the interval dominance order (IDO) is an ordinal property. Such a family need not obey single crossing differences.

A function  is regular if  is non-empty for any , where  denotes the interval .

Theorem 2: Denote .

We only need to consider the case where . By definition , for all . Moreover, by IDO we have . Therefore, . Furthermore, it must be that . Otherwise, i.e., if , then by IDO we have , which contradicts that . To show the necessity of IDO, assume that there is an interval  such that  for all . This means that . There are two possible violations  of IDO. One possibility is that . Another possible violation of IDO occurs if  but . Q.E.D.

The next result gives useful sufficient conditions for single crossing differences and IDO.

(i) If, for any , there exists a number  such that  for all , then  obey single crossing differences. (ii)  If, for any , there exists a nondecreasing, strictly positive function  such that  for all , then  obey IDO.

If agent decides to stop at time , the present value of his accumulated profit is

where  is the discount rate. Since , the function  has many turning points and they do not vary with the discount rate. Take any . Then,   Since  is positive and increasing, Proposition 1 says that  obey IDO and, by Theorem 2, the set of optimal stopping times is decreasing.

Multi-dimensional optimization problems 

The above results can be extended to a multi-dimensional setting. Let  be a lattice.

Examples of the strong set order in higher dimensions.
Note that  is a lattice.
Note that  is a lattice. Let ,  denote sets of probability distributions with support  and  respectively.

Definition (Quasisupermodular function): Let  be a lattice. The function  is quasisupermodular (QSM) if

The function  is said to be a supermodular function if   Every supermodular function is quasisupermodular.  As in the case of single crossing differences, and unlike supermodularity, quasisupermodularity is an ordinal property. That is, if function  is quasisupermodular, then so is function , where  is some strictly increasing function.

Then  for any  and 
Proof: . By quasisupermodularity, and by the single crossing differences, . Hence . Now assume that . Then . By quasisupermodularity, and by single crossing differences . But this contradicts that . Hence, .

. Then,  and thus , which guarantees that, if , then . To show that single crossing differences also hold, set , where . Then  for any  guarantees that, if , then . Q.E.D.

Application (Production with multiple goods):  Let  denote the vector of inputs (drawn from a sublattice  of ) of a profit-maximizing firm,  be the vector of input prices, and  the revenue function mapping input vector  to revenue (in ). Hence,  has increasing differences (and so it obeys single crossing differences).

Constrained optimization problems 

In some important economic applications, the relevant change in the constraint set cannot be easily understood as an increase with respect to the strong set order and so Theorem 3 cannot be easily applied. For example, consider a consumer who maximizes a utility function  subject to a budget constraint. A basic property of consumer demand is normality, which means (in the case where demand is unique) that the demand of each good is increasing in wealth. Theorem 3 cannot be straightforwardly applied to obtain conditions for normality, because  if  (when  is derived from the Euclidean order). In this case, the following result holds.

Theorem 4: Suppose  is supermodular and concave.

On the other hand, supermodularity and concavity together guarantee that

for any , where .

Monotone comparative statics under uncertainty 

Let , and  be a family of real-valued functions defined on  that obey single crossing differences or the interval dominance order. Interpreting  to be the state of the world, this says that the optimal action is increasing in the state if the state is known. Suppose, however, that the action  is taken before  is realized; then it seems reasonable that the optimal action should increase with the likelihood of higher states. Choosing under uncertainty, the agent maximizes

The results in this section give condition under which this holds.

Theorem 5: Suppose    obeys increasing differences. If  is ordered with respect to first order stochastic dominance, then   obeys increasing differences.

Proof: For any , define . Then,  or equivalently . Q.E.D.

In the following theorem, X can be either ``single crossing differences" or ``the interval dominance order".

Theorem 6:  Suppose  (for )  obeys X.  Then the family  obeys X if  is ordered with respect to the monotone likelihood ratio property.

The monotone likelihood ratio condition in this theorem cannot be weakened, as the next result demonstrates.

Application (Optimal portfolio problem): An agent maximizes expected utility with the strictly increasing Bernoulli utility function .  (Concavity is not assumed, so we allow the agent to be risk loving.) The wealth of the agent, can be invested in a safe or risky asset. The prices of the two assets are normalized at 1. The safe asset gives a constant return , while the return of the risky asset  is governed by the
probability distribution . Let  denote the agent's investment in the risky asset. The agent chooses  to maximize

Note that , where , obeys single crossing (though
not necessarily increasing) differences.
respect to the monotone likelihood ratio property.

Aggregation of the single crossing property 

While the sum of increasing functions is also increasing, it is clear that the single crossing property need not be preserved by aggregation.  For the sum of single crossing functions to have the same property requires that the functions be related to each other in a particular manner.

Definition (monotone signed-ratio):  Let  be a poset. Two functions  obey signed{ -}ratio monotonicity if, for any , the following holds:

 

 

Proposition 3: Let  and  be two single crossing functions. Then  is a single crossing function for any non{-}negative scalars  and  if and only if  and  obey signed-ratio monotonicity.

Define , so that . Since  is a single crossing function, it must be that , for any . Moreover, recall that since  is a single crossing function, then . By rearranging the above inequality, we conclude that

 

To prove the converse, without loss of generality assume that . Suppose that
 
Hence, . Since  and  obey signed{-}ratio monotonicity it must be that

 

Since  is a single crossing function, and so  Q.E.D.

This result can be generalized to infinite sums in the following sense.

Application (Monopoly problem under uncertainty): A firm faces uncertainty over the demand for its output  and the profit at state  is given
The firm maximizes

 

By definition, the latter says that, for any , the function

 

is a single crossing function.

See also 

Comparative statics
Microeconomics
Model (economics)
Qualitative economics

Selected literature on monotone comparative statics and its applications 

 Basic techniques – Milgrom and Shannon (1994)., Milgrom (1994), Shannon (1995), Topkis (1998), Edlin and Shannon (1998), Athey (2002), Quah (2007), Quah and Strulovici (2009, 2012), Kukushkin (2013);
 Production complementarities and their implications – Milgrom and Roberts (1990a, 1995); Topkis (1995);
 Games with strategic complementarities – Milgrom and Roberts (1990b); Topkis (1979); Vives (1990);
 Comparative statics of the consumer optimization problem – Antoniadou (2007); Quah (2007); Shirai (2013);
 Monotone comparative statics under uncertainty – Athey (2002); Quah and Strulovici (2009, 2012);
 Monotone comparative statics for models of politics – Gans and Smart (1996), Ashworth and Bueno de Mesquita (2006);
 Comparative statics of optimal stopping problems – Quah and Strulovici (2009, 2013);
 Monotone Bayesian games – Athey (2001); McAdams (2003); Quah and Strulovici (2012);
 Bayesian games with strategic complementarities – Van Zandt (2010); Vives and Van Zandt (2007);
 Auction theory – Athey (2001); McAdams (2007a,b); Reny and Zamir (2004);
 Comparing information structures – Quah and Strulovici (2009);
 Comparative statics in Industrial Organisation – Amir and Grilo (1999); Amir and Lambson (2003); Vives (2001);
 Neoclassical optimal growth – Amir (1996b); Datta, Mirman, and Reffett (2002);
 Multi-stage games – Vives (2009);
 Dynamic stochastic games with infinite horizon – Amir (1996a, 2003); Balbus, Reffett, and Woźny (2013, 2014)

References 

Comparative statics